This is a list of Cabinet Ministers from Finland by ministerial portfolio. The list is an alphabetical order.

Political party table

List of ministers

Minister of Regional and Municipal Affairs

Minister for Housing

Minister of Housing and Communications

Minister of Economic Affairs

Minister of Provisions

Master of Provisional Affairs

Minister for European Affairs and Foreign Trade

People's Service Minister

Minister of Trade and Industry

Master of Trade and Industry affairs

Minister for International Development

Minister of Church and Education

Master of Church and Education affairs

Minister of Transport and Public Works

Master of Transport and Public Works

Minister of Culture and Housing

Minister for Culture and Sports

Minister of Culture

Minister of Local Government and Public Reforms

Minister of Transport and Local Government

Minister of Transport and Communications

Minister of Transport

Minister of Agriculture and Forestry

Minister of Agriculture and the Environmenti

Minister for Europe and immigration

Master of Agricultural affairs

Minister of Agriculture

Deputy Minister of People's Service

Deputy Minister of Trade and Industry

Deputy Minister of Transport and Public Works

Deputy Minister of Transport

Deputy Minister of Agriculture and Forestry

Deputy Minister of Agriculture

Deputy Minister for Justice

Deputy Minister of Education

Deputy Minister of Defence

Deputy Minister of Interior

Deputy Minister of Health and Social Affairs

Deputy Minister of Social Affairs

Deputy Minister of Employment

Deputy Minister of Foreign

Minister at Council of State

Deputy Minister of Finance

Deputy Minister of Environment

Minister of Justice

Minister of Justice and Employment

Master of Justice affairs

Minister of Education

Minister of Education and Culture

Minister of Education and Communications

Minister of Family Affairs and Social Services

Minister of  Social Services

Minister of Defence

Prime Minister

Minister without Portfolio

Master of Without Portfolio

Chairman of the Senate

Deputy Chairman of the Senate

Minister of Interior Affairs

Master of Internal affairs

Minister of Social Affairs and Health

Minister of Interior

Minister of Social Affairs

Master of Social affairs

Master of War Affairs

Minister of War

Coordinate Minister of Finance

Minister of Employment

Minister of Labour

Minister of Foreign Affairs

Master of Foreign Affairs

Minister for Foreign Trade and Development

Minister of Foreign Trade

Minister of Finance

Master of Financial affairs

Minister of  Communications

Minister of Environment

References

Lists of government ministers of Finland